In the U.S. state of Connecticut, state highways are grouped into signed routes, unsigned special service roads (SSR), and unsigned state roads (SR). State roads are feeder roads that provide additional interconnections between signed routes, or long entrance/exit ramps to expressways. Roads classified by the Connecticut Department of Transportation as state roads are given an unsigned number designation between 500 and 999, with the first digit depending on which Maintenance District the road is primarily located in. Below is a list of the state roads that are classified as arterial roads.

See also

List of State Routes in Connecticut

References

 
State Roads